Monique Angermüller (born 27 January 1984) is a retired German speed skater who represented Germany at the 2010 Winter Olympics. She participated in the 500, 1000, and 1500 metres distances. Her specialty is considered to be the 1000 m.

References

External links 
  
 
 Monique Angermüller at SpeedskatingResults.com
 
 
 

1984 births
German female speed skaters
Speed skaters at the 2010 Winter Olympics
Speed skaters at the 2014 Winter Olympics
Olympic speed skaters of Germany
Speed skaters from Berlin
Living people